Sir Henry Willock (17901858) was a lieutenant-colonel and the British Envoy to Persia from 1815-1826. He was the chairman of the East India Company (EIC) in 1844–45. Willock married Elizabeth Davis, daughter of EIC Director and orientalist Samuel Davis, in 1826.

References

British East India Company
Directors of the British East India Company
British East India Company people
British Indian history
1790 births
1858 deaths
19th-century British businesspeople